Vigy is a commune in the Moselle department in Grand Est in north-eastern France.

Geography

Situated  from Metz, Vigy lies on the border of Germany and Luxembourg. The village of Vigy is located in a sector recognized for its landscape qualities. Vigy enjoys a privileged location on the edge of a forest.

Part of village belongs to an Important Bird Area

Etymology

The name of the village may come from a man of Gallo-Roman origin, Vigius.

History

Founded as a city by the Romans or Gallo-Romans, Vigy was given to the Abbey of Saint-Arnould on June 23, 715. In 1365, the people of Vigy were placed under the protection of Luxembourg. In 1635, on September 12, almost the entirety of the village was burned by the Spanish. It was reattached to France in 1648.

Vigy has been the seat of a canton since the French Revolution.

During World War I, the residents of Vigy were resettled in Mussidan in the Dordogne.

Economy

Initially, the village grew on agriculture.

The early prosperity of the village was largely due to the nearby iron and steel industries. Many of these industries have since disappeared. Nowadays, industry consists of vehicle manufacturing and logistics.

Demography

Sights

The region, with its rich and varied historical heritage, lends itself to eco-tourism.

Field Maze

As a family or with a group of friends, your challenge is to find your way through the corn maze, decoding the key to puzzles you will find signposted along the way.

There is a field maze, which is open from July to September. Each year there is a new field Maze.

Steam train

This line was linked to the former SNCF Vigy to Hombourg-Budange one. In 1985, the local authorities had stopped supporting the line. ALEMF operated in this line with the definition of a "touristic" railway since 1986.

On April 1, 1908 was put in regular circulation the first engine at vapor. The line celebrated its centenary on May 24, 2008.

It is open from April to October.

Rail-cycle (Velorail in French)

Rail-cycle with 4 wheels. A single bicycle may also be modified with an outrigger and locating wheels to operate upon rails

Forest outing
Booking recommended 

It is open from April to October.

Notre-Dame-de-Rabas

As the legend says: Once upon a time a group of hunter was following a deer in the forest of St. Hubert. It was a very very hot day and the people were very thirsty. They have been suffering when suddenly their horses found a spring. To thank it for the nature they built a little chapel next to the spring. 

The chapel is linked in legend to Charlemagne and may have existed as early as 806.

In 1049, the Pope Leo IX would have come to devote the church. During the centuries the church of St. Arnold had the authority above the chapel.

Unfortunately, during the French Revolution the chapel was destroyed. Later the chapel
has been rebuilt.

In 1884, the reconstruction of the chapel started by Abbé Cazin and the Vicomte de Coetlosquet offered three windows for
the chapel. It got the shape we can see now.

Today, there are a new  small church in the middle of forest. On the Monday of Pentecost and Corpus Christi (feast) pilgrims come to the chapel.

Adeppa

In 1961, associations and federations of popular education of the Moselle, mobilized around common values ("to allow each citizen to be an actor of the transformation of a company where the Man finds finally his true place"). In 1963, the association ADEPPA of which the goal was to become a training centre of the actors of community life, with the possibility of accommodating, in its houses of lodging, of many groups in the middle of an exceptional landscape

Adeppa is located at Vigy. Adeppa is a popular resort on the edge of a forest.

Others

Vigy is known for its dynamism and its strong associative fabric with more than forty associations.

Sports
Judo, tennis, handball, skittles, gymnastics, coil-defense, tennis, football clubs
Game of bowls Vigy.

Music
Battery brass band “the Jeanne of Arc”

Civil heritage
 Arboretum
 "Église Saint-Léger" (churche - 1868)
 Since La maison du Jambon was founded by Augustin Mazzocchi in 1920.

Sisters of Divine Providence (Soeurs de la divine providence) in Vigy (Hessange)

The Congregation of the Sisters of Divine Providence was founded by John Martin Moye, who with the assistance of Mademoiselle Marguerite LeComte, opened the first school of congregation at Vigy in 1762. After the French Revolution, all sisters was transferred to St. Jean de Bassel in Lorraine.

Films & documents
You can watch few minutes in Vigy in these French films
Life and Nothing But ( "la vie et rien d'autre" French title, French film, French director : Bertrand Tavernier)
Je m'appelle Victor  (French film, French director : Guy Jacques)
others documents on TV (RTL, TF1,ZDF) on radio (France Inter, online on France Bleu Lorraine Nord radio on August 9, 2009 )

Education

The Congregation of the Sisters of Divine Providence was founded by John Martin Moye, who with the assistance of Mademoiselle Marguerite LeComte, opened the first school of congregation at Vigy in 1762. After the French Revolution, all sisters was transferred to St. Jean de Bassel in Lorraine.

Today there are three public schools.

Infrastructure

Vigy is located at the intersection of two majors axes: A4 motorway (going from Paris to Strasbourg) and the A31 motorway (going to Luxembourg at the North and towards Nancy)

 A4 - Number 37 - Ennery-Argancy
 A31 - Hauconcourt

by bus   : Going to Metz city or Hagondange station. There are only one bus by day  (daily : Monday to Saturday)

The 400,000 volt line connecting Marlenheim (near Strasbourg) to Vigy entered service on April 30, 2009 is the fruit of a consultative process initiated back in 1998. Other line connecting Germany, and Luxembourg.

The dispatching of Vigy reinforcing the electricity transmission capacities of France’s greater eastern area.

Notable people

 Catherine Marsal, 1971-01-20 in Metz, cyclist  is a retired female racing cyclist from France. She represented her native country at four Summer Olympics: 1988, 1992, 1996, and 2000. Her biggest achievements were winning the 1990 Giro d'Italia Femminile and the world title in the women's individual road race (1990).
 Jean-Martin Moye

Twin towns - sister cities
  Mussidan, France; since 1990
 Sourzac; since 1991

See also
Communes of the Moselle department
Geography of Saarland, Moselle, and Luxembourg

References

External links

 Getaway in the Metz Region: the Vigy Rail Bike
Official Website of the city of Vigy
Official Website of Intercommunality of Vigy
ADEPPA (Official Website - French language)

Communes of Moselle (department)